Christopher John Cron Sr. (born March 31, 1964) is an American former professional baseball player,  manager, and current coach.  he is the assistant hitting coach for the Oakland Athletics of Major League Baseball (MLB). He played in Major League Baseball (MLB) for the California Angels and Chicago White Sox, and has managed in Minor League Baseball.

Career
Drafted by the Atlanta Braves in the second round of the 1984 Major League Baseball Draft, Cron made his Major League Baseball debut with the California Angels on August 15, 1991 and appeared in his final game on October 4, 1992.

During the 1995 season, Cron retired and became manager of the Bristol White Sox, a minor league affiliate of the Chicago White Sox, and has spent several years as a manager in the White Sox farm system.

Cron has managed at every level in the minor leagues, starting in 1995. His teams have included: Bristol (1995), Hickory (1996–97), Winston-Salem (1998), Birmingham (1999), Colorado Springs (2000–02), Great Falls (2003), Kannapolis (2004), Winston-Salem (2005), Birmingham (2006) and Great Falls (2007–08). He served as roving minor league infield coach in 2009. He was the manager of the Great Falls Voyagers in 2010.

On Monday, December 13, 2010, Cron was named manager of the Erie SeaWolves. In 2013, he was selected as one of several managers for the All-Star Futures Game. In 2019, he was hired as manager of the Reno Aces. He managed his son, Kevin, while he was on the Aces in 2019.

On January 14, 2022, Cron was hired as the assistant hitting coach for the Oakland Athletics.

Personal
His sons, C. J. and Kevin Cron, are professional baseball players. He is the cousin of Major League Baseball player Chad Moeller.

References

External links

1964 births
Living people
American expatriate baseball players in Canada
Baseball coaches from New Mexico
Baseball players from Albuquerque, New Mexico
Birmingham Barons managers
California Angels players
Charlotte Knights players
Chicago White Sox players
Colorado Springs Sky Sox managers
Durham Bulls players
Edmonton Trappers players
Major League Baseball first basemen
Major League Baseball replacement players
Midland Angels players
Nashville Sounds players
Palm Springs Angels players
Pulaski Braves players
Quad Cities Angels players
Santa Ana Dons baseball players
Sumter Braves players
Vancouver Canadians players